Brandon Lowry (born November 2, 1983), better known by his stage name Sterling Fox, is a songwriter, record producer and recording artist. He has written and produced multiple #1 songs.

Life and Times
Brandon Lowry grew up in Stoystown, Pennsylvania. In his early years, Brandon studied piano and experimented with bootleg tape recording. His father worked in a factory and coal plant to support the family. After high school, Lowry studied classical piano at Duquesne University. He graduated from college, and after an early stint as a cruise ship pianist, Lowry's musical career came to fruition in 2007 after moving to New York City. He quickly came into demand as a session player, songwriter, and music producer. In 2008, he co-founded a music production team Robopop with Daniel Omelio. Soon after, Robopop went on to cowrite and coproduce "Stereo Hearts" by Gym Class Heroes, featuring Adam Levine. The record was certified 3× platinum in the United States, 3× platinum in Australia and 2× platinum in Canada and reached #1 on the Billboard US Pop Songs Chart.

After the success of "Stereo Hearts", Robopop coproduced the song "Video Games", the first breakout release from artist Lana Del Rey. "Video Games" was a huge success and its album Born to Die has gone on to sell over 5,000,000 units worldwide. Lowry also played the piano part on the recording and was credited as a mixing engineer. After "Video Games", Lowry split off from Robopop and reemerged under a new alter ego Sterling Fox.

In 2013, Sterling cowrote the dance crossover hit "Take Me Home" by Cash Cash, which was certified gold in the US and reach #5 in the UK. In 2014, Sterling produced and cowrote the #1 iTunes hit single "Wasted Love" for The Voice Season 7 finalist Matt McAndrew.

As a vocalist, Fox has worked on a number of electronic collaborations, including cowriting and singing the song "Shame on Me" from Avicii's album True and also writing and singing the song "Talk to Myself" from Avicii's 2nd album Stories.

In 2015, he cowrote the Adam Lambert single Ghost Town with Max Martin, which would go on to become certified Gold in the US. He also added the whistle part to the hook.

Fox would also contribute writing to Where the Devil Don't Go for Elle King's album Love Stuff, which became one of the top selling Rock albums of the year. In 2016, it was featured in the Season 4 theatrical trailer for Orange is the New Black.

In 2016, he cowrote "Man on the Moon" and "If I'm Dancing" on the Britney Spears album Glory and additionally added guitar and background vocals on "Man on the Moon".

Over his career, he has written songs with the likes of  Madonna, Max Martin, Julia Michaels, and others, and his works have been performed live by the likes of Queen, One Direction, and Maroon 5.

In 2017 Fox performed at SXSW and was subsequently threatened with arrest by festival coordinators for using a large collage of corporate logo parodies as his stage backdrop while street performing throughout the city.

Immediately after the inauguration of Donald Trump as US president, Lowry moved to Montreal, Canada for a year.

In 2018, Lowry retired his Sterling Fox pseudonym and introduced a new project called Baby Fuzz. Baby Fuzz released several singles and music videos in 2018 and 2019 to critical acclaim. In March 2019, Baby Fuzz independently released its debut album Plastic Paradise.

Lowry is currently still writing songs for others, running a small indie label Blanket Fort, and also touring and releasing music as Baby Fuzz.

Discography

References 

Living people
1983 births
Take This To Heart Records artists